Inés Gaviria (born March 15, 1979) is a Colombian singer-songwriter based in Miami, Florida. Her first album with the Respek Label, and distributed by Universal Records, was released in June 2005. She was nominated for the 2006 Latin Grammy Awards.

Awards and nominations

Latin Grammy Awards

A Latin Grammy Award is an accolade by the Latin Academy of Recording Arts & Sciences to recognize outstanding achievement in the music industry.

|-
| rowspan="2" |2006 || Inés Gaviria || Best New Artist || 
|-
| A Mi Manera || Best Female Pop Vocal Album || 
|-

References

1979 births
American women singer-songwriters
Living people
21st-century American singers
21st-century American women singers
Women in Latin music